Suite provençale, Op. 152, is a symphonic work written by Darius Milhaud in 1936. A version for orchestra alone, Op. 152c, was premiered by Milhaud himself in Venice on 12 September 1937; the ballet version, Op. 152d, premiered at the Opéra-Comique in Paris on 1 February 1938 under the direction of Roger Désormière.

Milhaud employed themes from 18th century Provençal, including themes by the composer André Campra.

Structure
The work consists of eight parts played as a single movement:
 Animé
 Très modéré
 Modéré
 Vif
 Modéré
 Vif
 Lent
 Vif

A typical performance lasts about 15 minutes.

References

Compositions by Darius Milhaud
1936 compositions